Jazz is an album by jazz artist Wallace Roney released in 2007.

Track listing
"Vater Time" (W. Roney) – 8:52
"Children of the Light" (A. Roney) – 5:22
"Inflorescent" (R. Carter) – 6:29
"Fela's Shine" (E. Allen/W. Roney) – 4:59
"Nia" (A. Roney) – 9:18
"Revolution: Resolution" (W. Roney) – 5:29
"Her Story" (W. Roney) – 5:46
"Stand" (S. Stone) – 10:58
"Un Poco Loco" (B. Powell) – 7:49

Personnel
Wallace Roney – trumpet
Antoine Roney – soprano sax, tenor sax, bass clarinet
Geri Allen – piano, keyboards (tracks 2,3,5,6,7,8&9)
Robert Irving III – keyboards, Fender Rhodes (tracks 1,4,6&8)
Rashaan Carter – bass
Eric Allen – drums, percussion
DJ Axum – turntables (tracks 1&4)
Val Jeanty – turntables (tracks 5,6&8)

2007 albums
Wallace Roney albums
HighNote Records albums